Kawase is an online brokerage registered in Cyprus that provides financial trading contracts for difference (CFD) on the currency markets, shares, ETFs, major indices and commodities such as precious metals; gold and crude oil. Kawase accommodates its financial services to both retail and institutional clients. The company is regulated by CySEC and is authorised by a number of regulatory authorities   thus falls under the European Union's Markets in Financial Instruments Directive (MiFID).

Products and Services
Kawase offer its traders with its own trading platform to trade from being the winner of the 'Best Retail Platform 2013’ at the FX Week e-FX awards in New York. The company's platform, provides ECN traders with greater price depth and Volume-weighted average price (VWAP). Kawase have also focused on mobile trading with mobile apps for both iOS and Android. The Kawase Apps offer news, support and account management functions. Kawase  is connected to its own aggregator, which is linked to 12+ of the world's leading banks to provide deep liquidity and offer 15+ stock exchanges.

Trading Facilities
Kawase develops and maintains its own trading platform and liquidity aggregation technology in-house by the group IT arm, which has been innovating and leading the finance market for the past 5 years., the group has invested more than US$50 Million and have a technical staff of 120 spread across 3 continents. Taking into consideration, Kawase by its numbers the total value of all client's open positions combined Net Open Positions limit reaches $825 million.

Regulatory information
Kawase is regulated by CySEC under licence number 138/11 also authorised by a number of regulatory authorities and falls under the European Union’s Markets in Financial Instruments Directive MiFID. Kawase is also registered with the regulators of 25 EU member states. As a consequence, the company is fully registered with BaFin and also a registered member with the Financial Conduct Authority (FCA) under reference number 579491 along with Banque De France.

References

External links
Official Website
Arbitrage Exchange

Financial services companies established in 2010
Financial derivative trading companies
Foreign exchange companies